Unannovu or Hunanav (also Hunanavan) is a village in the Lachin District of Azerbaijan. The village is located in the new corridor between Armenia and Nagorno-Karabakh, controlled by Russian peacekeepers, that replaced the Lachin corridor in August 2022.

History 
The village was located in the Armenian-occupied territories surrounding Nagorno-Karabakh, coming under the control of ethnic Armenian forces during the First Nagorno-Karabakh War in the early 1990s, subsequently becoming part of the breakaway Republic of Artsakh as part of its Shushi Province. The village was returned to Azerbaijan as part of the 2020 Nagorno-Karabakh ceasefire agreement.

Notable natives 
 Israfil Shaverdiyev — National Hero of Azerbaijan.

References

External links 
 

Populated places in Lachin District